Oxycnemis acuna is a moth of the family Noctuidae first described by William Barnes in 1907. It is found in North America, including Arizona and Texas.

The wingspan is about 17 mm.

External links

Cuculliinae
Moths described in 1907